Reysham is a Maldivian television series directed by Abdul Faththaah and Mohamed Rasheed. Written by Moosa Saaid and distributed through the television channel Television Maldives, the series stars Mariyam Nisha, Ahmed, Assad Shareef, Shareef and Aminath Rasheedha in main roles.

Cast

Main
 Mariyam Nisha as Zulfa
 Ahmed as Yazdhan
 Asad Shareef as Nasih
 Shareef as Ahusan
 Aminath Rasheedha as Athifa; Zulfa's mother
 Fauziyya Hassan as Sakeena
 Waleedha Waleed as Shaahidha
 Adam Manik as Shakir; Zulfa's father
 Mariyam Shakeela as Mariyam
 Mariyam Rasheedha as Zahira; Yazdhan's mother
 Aishath Shiznee as Riyasha

Recurring
 Afeef as Nazim
 Nooma Ibrahim as Nashwa
 Satthar Ibrahim Manik as Mariyam's father
 Shauzoon as Sameer
 Anee as Amira; Zulfa's colleague
 Hasifa as Azma; Zulfa's colleague
 Ashraf Nu'uman as Shahidh
 Mariyam Nazima as Jeelan
 Sakeena as Ahusan's mother
 Abdulla Faisal as Nabeel
 Athifa as Liva; Zulfa's younger sister
 Mohamed Rasheed as Nashid; Yazdhan’s father

Guest
 Yazan as Unaish
 Koyya Hassan Manik as a magistrate
 Shareefa as Mariyam's mother
 Ahmed Saeed as Nasih's friend (Episode 4)
 Aishath Hanim
 Nazumee as Majid
 Mohamed Abdulla (Special appearance in the song medley; Episode 9)
 Aishath Gulfa (Special appearance in the song medley; Episode 9)

Episodes

Soundtrack

Response
The series was released in 2000. Upon release, it received positive reviews from critics and viewers. Sajid Abdulla reviewing from MuniAvas selected the series in the "Top 10 best television series of all time" and wrote: "The series will remain one of the best direction by Abdul Faththaah. Known for its emotional storyline and superb acting, the acting by Nisha in the series is her career-best". The theme song of the series was a chartbuster and was "unbeatable" even after its cover versions".

References

Serial drama television series
Maldivian television shows